BYO Split Series Volume I is an album by Leatherface and Hot Water Music, the first entry in the BYO Split Series. It was released in 1999.

Production
The bands recorded the album after a joint 1998 tour of America. They embarked on a second joint tour, in 2000, to support the album.

"Andy" is about former Leatherface bass player Andy Crighton, who had committed suicide before the band reformed.

Critical reception
Trouser Press called "Andy" "a blistering return," writing that Leatherface's half of the album "picks up where The Last left off, obliterating the five-year gap between studio recordings."

Track listing

References

External links
BYO Split Series Volume I on BYO Records

BYO Split Series
1999 albums
Hot Water Music albums